Gibbestola is a genus of longhorn beetles of the subfamily Lamiinae, containing the following species:

 Gibbestola flavescens Breuning, 1940
 Gibbestola griseovaria Breuning, 1940

References

Desmiphorini